Marinomonas spartinae is a  Gram-negative, chemoorganotrophic, aerobic and halophilic bacterium from the genus of Marinomonas which has been isolated from the plant Spartina maritima.

References

External links
Type strain of Marinomonas spartinae at BacDive -  the Bacterial Diversity Metadatabase

Oceanospirillales
Bacteria described in 2016